Shraga Simmons (born 1 July 1961) is an Orthodox Jewish rabbi, journalist, filmmaker, brand builder and leader in Torah-themed marketing. He is the co-founder of Aish.com, the educational website and co-founder of HonestReporting, the pro-Israel media watch group. He is also founder and director of the online Torah academy JewishPathways.com.

Biography
Simmons was born and raised in Buffalo, New York. After graduating from the University of Texas at Austin with a degree in journalism, he worked as a reporter for newspapers and magazines, specializing in entertainment. He led marketing campaigns for various politicians, entertainers and professional athletes. In 1994, he received rabbinic ordination from the Chief Rabbi of Jerusalem. He served three years as Director of Outreach for Aish HaTorah in Los Angeles.

Jewish education
He was a close student of Rabbi Noah Weinberg, served as his ghostwriter for 20 years, and co-authored the best-selling 48 Ways to Wisdom. In 1997, he was selected to run the Aish internet site, serving as editor for 25 years. He is often quoted as a rabbinical authority in print and online media. He is author of: LifeWisdom Series; the Discovery Seminar sourcebook;  "Ask the Rabbi" series featured on various websites; courses on Brachot, Middot, Jewish History; "Shraga's Weekly" on Chumash; reporting for Ami magazine and Mishpacha magazine; and hundreds of essays on spirituality, translated into 10 languages.

Pro-Israel activism
Simmons is an activist in matters regarding media bias relating to the Arab–Israeli conflict. In 2000, he co-founded HonestReporting.com, the pro-Israel media watch group. In 2012, he authored David & Goliath, a study of Western media bias in coverage of the Arab–Israeli conflict. As a historical study of the years 2000–2011, the book is sourced with over 2,000 footnotes and includes statistical studies that claim to document a pervasive pro-Palestinian slant in the New York Times, CNN and much of the British media.

In 2006 he produced a short film "Photo Fraud in Lebanon" which became the first Jewish-themed video to register 5 million views. In 2009 he produced a video which exposed glaring inconsistencies in media coverage of the Gaza flotilla raid.

In 2012 he wrote, directed and produced a short Internet film, The Red Line, explaining the urgency of preventing Iran from acquiring nuclear weapons.

In 2017 he wrote, directed and produced Jerusalem: Unite or Divide?, a film and marketing campaign to promote the 50th anniversary of reunified Jerusalem.

Books

Together with Rabbi Nechemia Coopersmith of Aish.com, Simmons has co-edited four collections of articles which originally appeared on that website:

Articles
"Antisemitism and the Holocaust" in

References

External links
David & Goliath: The Explosive Inside Story of Media Bias in the Israeli-Palestinian Conflict
Red Line on Iran film
Shraga Simmons website
Shraga's Weekly commentary on the parsha
List of articles by Simmons on Aish.com
How Terrorists Manipulate the Media (video analysis by Shraga Simmons)

1961 births
Living people
Religious leaders from Buffalo, New York
Rabbis of Aish HaTorah
American Orthodox rabbis
21st-century American Jews